This is a list of the NCAA outdoor champions in the decathlon. International javelin design regulations changed in 1986, so all javelin throws in 1985 and before were using the old, more aerodynamic javelin.

Champions
Key
w=wind aided
A=Altitude assisted

References

GBR Athletics

Flash Results, Inc.

External links
NCAA Division I men's outdoor track and field

Decathlon NCAA Men's Division I Outdoor Track and Field Championships
Outdoor track, men
decathlon